Sam Sen railway station is a railway station in Bangkok, the capital of Thailand. Owned by the State Railway of Thailand, it is served by the Northern, Northeastern and Southern lines. All passenger trains passing must stop at this station. Sam Sen Station overlaps the area of Thanon Nakhon Chai Si Subdistrict, Dusit District, and Phaya Thai Subdistrict, Phaya Thai District, Bangkok. It can be considered as an area in the middle between Sam Sen (Dusit side) and Rama VI Roads (Phaya Thai side) along the Khlong Prapa canal. About 3,000–5,000 people use this station daily.

Sam Sen Station is a Class 1 Station, number code: 1004, English alphabet code: SSN. There are two platforms. Platform 1 is for trains heading to further destinations along the routes. Platform 2 is for trains heading back to Bangkok railway station. Eighty-six trains serve this station daily including a few excursion trains to Nam Tok and Suan Son Pradipat and some special trains. 

Originally, the station building was mushroom-shaped, with originality and great beauty. It was later torn down to make way for the Hopewell Project (BERTS). The area near north side of the station was also the site of one of the first PDRC protests against the amnesty bill in the 2013–2014 Thai political crisis, used between 31 October to 4 November 2013. This was later moved to Ratchadamnoen Avenue on the 4th.

Bus route 
Affiliated air-conditioned bus no.9 (Kanlapapruek Depot–Sam Sen Railway Station) is the only bus that operates until this station. It operates via these primary locations: Talat Phlu, Wongwian Yai, Pak Khlong Talat, Sanam Luang, Bang Lamphu, Wat Sam Phraya, Thewet, Saint Gabriel's College, Vajira Hospital and here, etc.

References

 
 

Railway stations in Bangkok
Buildings and structures in Bangkok
Railway stations opened in 1951